Willy Schnyder (24 January 1894 – 12 March 1946) was a Swiss sports shooter. He competed in two events at the 1924 Summer Olympics.

References

External links
 

1894 births
1946 deaths
Swiss male sport shooters
Olympic shooters of Switzerland
Shooters at the 1924 Summer Olympics
Place of birth missing